Kildonan railway station is a railway station near Kildonan Lodge in the Highland council area in the north of Scotland. All services are operated by ScotRail, who manage the station.

History 

The station opened on 28 July 1874. In 1952 the station was awarded a special class award in the British Railway (Scottish Region) Best Kept Stations Competition.

Accidents and incidents 
On 7 February 1884 there was an accident at the station. A special fish train from Wick approached the station when it derailed and ploughed up several hundred yards of track. The fireman, Alexander Campbell of Wick, died and the engine driver, David Mathieson of Wick was badly injured.

Proposed closure 
On 10 June 2018, it was announced that Hitrans had proposed the station for closure, shaving four minutes off journey times on the Inverness to Thurso/Wick route and put application in to Transport Scotland to consider the proposals. However following objections by three local councillors Hitrans had withdrawn the application.

Facilities 
The station has very basic facilities, including a waiting shelter, a bench, a help point and bike racks. As there are no facilities to purchase tickets, passengers must buy one in advance, or from the guard on the train.

Previously, passengers wishing to board a train at Scotscalder had to flag the train by raising their arm (as is still done at other request stops around the country); this meant that the driver needed to reduce the train's speed before a request stop (to look out for any potential passengers on the platform and be able to stop if necessary), even if the platform was empty. The new system consists of an automatic kiosk (with a button for passengers to press) at the platform; this will alert the driver about any waiting passengers in advance and, if there is no requirement to stop, the train can maintain line speed through the request stops, thus improving reliability on the whole line.

Passenger volume 
Due to the extremely sparse and small population it serves, Kildonan is one of the least used stations in the country, although its reputation means that it has a higher patronage than would be expected. It is currently the 16th least used railway station in the United Kingdom and the 2nd least used on the Far North Line.

The statistics cover twelve month periods that start in April.

Services 
It is currently served by four trains each day (Mon-Sat) to Inverness and three trains in the opposite direction to Wick (via Thurso), with one train in each direction on a Sunday.

This station is designated as a request stop. This means that passengers intending to alight must inform the guard in advance, and any passengers wishing to board must press a "request" button located at the kiosk on the platform.

References

External links 

Railway stations in Sutherland
Railway stations served by ScotRail
Railway stations in Great Britain opened in 1874
Former Highland Railway stations
Low usage railway stations in the United Kingdom
Railway request stops in Great Britain
William Baxter railway stations